Eli Amir (Arabic:ايلى عمير) (September 26, 1937) is an Iraqi-born Israeli writer and civil servant. He served as director general of the Youth Aliyah Department of the Jewish Agency.

Biography
Amir was born Fuad Elias Nasah Halschi in Baghdad, Iraq.  He immigrated to Israel with his family in 1950, and went to school in Kibbutz Mishmar HaEmek.  He is now living in Gilo, Jerusalem.
Amir studied at the Hebrew University of Jerusalem.

From 1964 to 1968 he served as adviser on Arab affairs to the Prime Minister of Israel, and as envoy for the Minister of Immigration Absorption of Israel to the United States. In 1984, he was appointed Director General of the Youth Aliyah department of the Jewish Agency.

Literature
Scapegoat (1983) is a semi-autobiographical story of Nuri, a 13-year-old immigrant boy from Iraq who is sent to a kibbutz and his absorption into Israeli society. The Dove Flyer (aka Farewell, Baghdad) (1992) is the story of 17-year-old Kabi Imari, an Iraqi Jewish boy growing up in a Zionist family. Saul's Love (1998) is a romance between Saul, born to a deeply rooted Sephardi family from Jerusalem, and Chaya, an Ashkenazi holocaust survivor. Jasmine (2005) is also largely autobiographical. The book's protagonist, Nuri Amari, who as a child had immigrated with his family from Iraq, is appointed to a government post in East Jerusalem in the wake of the Six-Day War. He meets Jasmine, a young Palestinian widow from a wealthy Christian refugee family.

Scapegoat is included in the Israeli secondary school syllabus, and was adapted into a play and television series.

Awards
Amir received Youth Aliyah's Jubilee Prize (1983), the Jewish Literature Prize (in Mexico, 1985), the Ahi Award (1994), Am Oved's Jubilee Prize (1994), the Yigal Allon Prize for Outstanding Service to Society (1997), the Book Publishers Association's Platinum Prize (1998), and the Prime Minister's Prize (2002).

Political activism
Amir has frequently called for social justice and denounced what he has described as the deterioration of the Israeli welfare state. In 2007, when his book Jasmine was published in Arabic in Egypt, he expressed hope that more Israeli books be spread in the Arab world, saying "How can there be peace without us knowing each other?". He repeated that statement in a literary soiree held by the Israeli Embassy in Cairo. He also signed a petition calling for Prime Minister of Israel Ehud Olmert to negotiate a cease-fire with Hamas. In 2006, his name came up as a successor to President of Israel Moshe Katsav and Amir said he would consider it.

Published works

In Hebrew
 Tarnegol Kaparot ("Scapegoat"), Am Oved, 1984
 Mafriah Ha-Yonim ("The Dove Flyer") Am Oved, 1992
 Ahavat Shaul ("Saul's Love"), Am Oved, 1998
 Yasmin ("Jasmine"), Am Oved, 2005
  Na'ar Ha-Ofnayim ("The Bicycle Boy"), Am Oved (2019)

Translated into English

See also
History of the Jews in Iraq
Israeli literature

References

External links

1937 births
Living people
Iraqi emigrants to Israel
Writers from Baghdad
Iraqi Jews
Israeli novelists
Hebrew-language writers